Goran Ivanišević was the defending champion but chose to compete at Los Angeles during the same week, reaching the semifinals.

Albert Costa won the title by defeating Thomas Muster 4–6, 6–4, 7–6(7–3), 2–6, 6–4 in the final.

Seeds
All seeds receive a bye into the second round.

Draw

Finals

Top half

Section 1

Section 2

Bottom half

Section 3

Section 4

References

External links
 Official results archive (ATP)
 Official results archive (ITF)

Singles
Austrian Open Kitzbühel